Homebodies is a 1974 comedy horror film directed by Larry Yust. The film features a cast of veteran actors, including Ian Wolfe, Ruth McDevitt, Peter Brocco, and Douglas Fowley. The film centers on elderly residents resorting to murder to protect their condemned building.<ref>Tom Weaver Double Feature Creature Attack 2003 Page 69 "... of his last features (to date) is Homebodies (1974), which has a cast of veterans (Ian Wolfe, Ruth McDevitt, Peter Brocco, Douglas Fowley, more) and a horror/comic plot about oldsters resorting to murder to protect their condemned building."</ref>

Plot

A quiet, elderly group of pensioners discover that their homes are scheduled to be demolished in order to make way for a block of flats. Their attempts to discourage the developers soon escalates from dissuasion to murder as they begin to rid themselves of both the developers and construction workers by any means necessary.

Cast
 Peter Brocco as Mr. Blakely
 Frances Fuller as Miss Emily
 William Hansen as Mr. Sandy
 Ruth McDevitt as Mrs. Loomis
 Paula Trueman as Mattie
 Ian Wolfe as Mr. Loomis
 Linda Marsh as Miss Pollack
 Douglas Fowley as Mr. Crawford

Production

Principal photography for Homebodies took place in 1973, on location in Cincinnati, Ohio. The film's cast was composed of veteran actors and actresses who, according to Daily Variety's report, "had appeared in nine hundred films, collectively, but were receiving top-billing for the first time in their careers". The film marked the second film production by the Cinema Entertainment Corporation.

Release

Home mediaHomebodies was released on VHS by Sony Pictures on June 23, 1994.

Kino Lorber released a Special Edition Blu-Ray version on November 2, 2021.

Reception

Time Out gave the film a positive review, complimenting the film's humor, well controlled tension, as well as Trueman's "saner version of Ruth Gordon" performance. Allmovie called the film "an unexpectedly haunting piece of work", complimenting the film's unpredictability, strong characterization, and direction. On his website Fantastic Movie Musings and Ramblings'', Dave Sindelar gave the film a positive review, calling it "an engaging curiosity". In his review, Sindelar commended the film for its "offbeat and eccentric" premise, and wicked sense of humor. Sindelar also commended the film's acting, particularly Trueman's.
Terror Trap awarded the film three out of a possible four stars, commending the film's acting, humor, feeling of urban decay, calling it "a heartwarming horror story".
Not all reviews for the film were positive. TV Guide awarded the film 2/4 stars, calling it "a strange little shocker about a murderous group of geriatrics", although the reviewer commended the film for being well shot, and directed.

References

External links
 
 
 
 

1974 films
1974 horror films
1970s black comedy films
1970s comedy horror films
American black comedy films
American comedy horror films
Embassy Pictures films
Films scored by Bernardo Segall
Films shot in Ohio
Films about old age
Films about real estate holdout
1974 comedy films
1974 drama films
1970s English-language films
1970s American films